The 2001-02 Serbian Hockey League season was the 11th season of the Serbian Hockey League, the top level of ice hockey in Serbia. Five teams participated in the league, and HK Vojvodina Novi Sad won the championship.

Regular season

Playoffs

Semifinals
HK Vojvodina Novi Sad 21 Spartak Subotica 0
KHK Crvena Zvezda 9 Partizan Belgrade 5

Final
HK Vojvodina Novi Sad – KHK Crvena Zvezda (9–3, 5–3)

3rd place
Partizan Belgrade – Spartak Subotica (7–5, 7–7 (3–0 SH)

External links
Season on hockeyarchives.info

Serbian Hockey League
Serbian Hockey League seasons
Serb